The 1995 Louisiana gubernatorial election was held on November 18, 1995 to elect the Governor of Louisiana.

Incumbent Democratic Governor Edwin Edwards had planned to run for re-election to a second consecutive and fifth overall term in office, but he announced in June 1994, shortly after marrying his second wife Candy Picou, that he would be retiring from politics at the end of his term.

All elections in Louisiana—with the exception of U.S. presidential elections—follow a variation of the open primary system called the jungle primary. Candidates of any and all parties are listed on one ballot; voters need not limit themselves to the candidates of one party when voting. Unless one candidate takes more than 50% of the vote in the first round, a run-off election is then held between the top two candidates, who may in fact be members of the same party.

In this election, the first round of voting was held on October 21, 1995, with Republican State Senator Mike Foster and Democratic U.S. Representative Cleo Fields finishing first and second with 26.1% and 19%, respectively. They thus advanced to a runoff, which was held on November 18, 1995. Foster defeated Fields in a landslide. As of 2020, this is the most recent Louisiana gubernatorial election in which the Republican candidate was not elected in the first round for their first term in office.

Candidates
The early field included eight individuals considered to be "major" candidates. These were State Representative Robert Adley, U.S. Representative Cleo Fields, State Senator Mike Foster, U.S. Representative William J. Jefferson, State Treasurer Mary Landrieu, former Governor Buddy Roemer, Lieutenant Governor Melinda Schwegmann and former Governor Dave Treen. 

On September 8th, Foster decided to switch his party affiliation from Democratic to Republican, this decision may have been noted as a gamechanger towards the outcome of the jungle primary. 

The makeup of the field led some analysts to dub this the "twins election", as each major candidate had a rival who appealed to a similar constituency or voter base. The sets of "twins" were: two mainstream Republican former governors (Treen and Roemer); two moderate Democratic female statewide office holders with ties to New Orleans (Landrieu and Schwegmann); two conservative Democratic state legislators (Foster and Adley); and two liberal, black Democratic U.S. Representatives (Fields and Jefferson).

Treen and Jefferson eventually chose not to officially enter the race and Foster switched his party identification to Republican at the time of qualifying. Attorney Phil Preis also entered the race as a Democrat and with a self-financed campaign was able to enter the top tier of candidates. Eight minor candidates, two Democrats and six Independents, also qualified for the ballot.

Democratic Party

Declared
 Gene H. Alexander
 Belinda Alexandrenko
 Robert Adley, State Representative
 Cleo Fields, U.S. Representative
 Mary Landrieu, Louisiana State Treasurer
 Phil Preis, attorney
 Melinda Schwegmann, Lieutenant Governor of Louisiana

Withdrew
 Harry Lee, Sheriff of Jefferson Parish

Declined
 William J. Jefferson, U.S. Representative

Republican Party

Declared
 Mike Foster, State Senator from St. Mary Parish
 Buddy Roemer, former Governor (1988-1992)

Declined
 Dave Treen, former Governor

Independents

Declared
 Lonnie Creech
 Ronnie Glynn Johnson, candidate for Mayor of Shreveport in 1990 and candidate for Governor in 1991
 Arthur D. "Jim" Nichols
 Anne Thompson, Republican candidate for Governor in 1991, for Louisiana's 1st congressional district in 1992 and for the State Senate in 1994
 Darryl Paul Ward, Democratic nominee for Louisiana's 6th congressional district in 1994
 Kenneth Woods

Results

See also
 United States gubernatorial elections, 1995

External links
 Gubernatorial runoff debate

References
 Secretary of State Elections Division.  Official Election Results Database

1995
Gubernatorial
Louisiana
November 1995 events in the United States